Mathieu Santos is an American singer, songwriter, bassist and multinstrumentalist. He is a founding member of the indie rock band Ra Ra Riot, and has also released solo work under his own name.
 
Santos' music has been described as a combination of orchestral pop and hypnotic indie rock. He released a solo record, Massachusetts 2010, in its eponymous year.

References

American multi-instrumentalists
American rock bass guitarists
American rock singers
American male songwriters
Living people
Year of birth missing (living people)
Barsuk Records artists